Mark Rene Mampassi (born 12 March 2003) is a Russian-Ukrainian professional footballer who plays as a centre-back for Turkish club Antalyaspor on loan from Lokomotiv Moscow in the Russian Premier League.

Career
Born in Donetsk, Mampassi began his career in the local Shakhtar Donetsk youth sportive school in 2010.

He played in the Ukrainian Premier League Reserves and never made his debut for the senior Shakhtar Donetsk's squad. In February 2021 Mampassi signed half-year loan contract with the Ukrainian Premier League's side FC Mariupol and made the debut for this team as a first half-time substitution player in a losing home match against FC Vorskla Poltava on 6 March 2021.

On 17 December 2021, he signed a 5-year contract with the Russian Premier League club FC Lokomotiv Moscow.

On 10 February 2023, Mampassi moved on loan to Antalyaspor in Turkey, with an option to buy.

Personal life
Born in Ukraine, Mampassi is of Republic of the Congo descent. He also holds Russian citizenship as he was registered as a non-foreign player by the Russian Premier League.

Career statistics

References

External links
 

2003 births
Ukrainian people of Republic of the Congo descent
Footballers from Donetsk
Living people
Ukrainian footballers
Ukraine youth international footballers
Association football defenders
FC Shakhtar Donetsk players
FC Mariupol players
FC Lokomotiv Moscow players
Antalyaspor footballers
Ukrainian Premier League players
Russian Premier League players
Ukrainian expatriate footballers
Expatriate footballers in Russia
Ukrainian expatriate sportspeople in Russia
Naturalised citizens of Russia
Expatriate footballers in Turkey
Ukrainian expatriate sportspeople in Turkey